The City of London Police is the territorial police force responsible for law enforcement within the City of London, including the Middle and Inner Temples. The force responsible for law enforcement within the remainder of the London region, outside the city, is the much larger Metropolitan Police, a separate organisation. The City of London, which is now primarily a financial business district with a small resident population but a large commuting workforce, is the historic core of London, and has an administrative history distinct from that of the rest of the metropolis, of which its separate police force is one manifestation.

The City of London area has a resident population of around 8,700, however there is also a daily influx of approximately 513,000 commuters into the city, along with thousands of tourists.

The police authority is the Common Council of the City and, unlike other territorial forces in England and Wales, there is not a police and crime commissioner replacing that police authority by way of the Police Reform and Social Responsibility Act 2011, but like a police and crime commissioner, the Common Council is elected.

, the force had a workforce of 1,355 including 861 full-time police officers and 494 support staff. The force is also supported by much smaller numbers of special constables, police community support officers, and designated officers. The headquarters is located at the Guildhall and there is an additional station at Bishopsgate. The City of London Police is the smallest territorial police force in England and Wales, both in terms of geographic area and head-count. The current commissioner (equivalent to the chief constable in non-London forces), appointed in 2022, is Angela McLaren.

History
Traditionally the responsibility for policing in the city had been divided between day and night City Watch, primarily under the two sheriffs. Their responsibilities were shared with the aldermen's officers – the ward beadles – who are now purely ceremonial. It was these officers' responsibility for ensuring that the Night Watch was maintained. Policing during the day eventually came under the City Patrol, which evolved into the City Day Police, which was modelled on the Metropolitan Police. The London City Police was officially formed in 1832, before becoming the City of London Police with the passing of the City of London Police Act 1839, which gave statutory approval to the force as an independent police body and headed off attempts made to merge it with the Metropolitan Police.

In 1840, the City of London Police moved its headquarters from the corporation's Guildhall to 26 Old Jewry, where it remained until it was relocated to Wood Street in 2001. The force's current headquarters is at the Guildhall. Former stations include Moor Lane (destroyed in the Blitz on 29 December 1940) and Cloak Lane (closed 1965).

Some notable events the force has been involved with include the Jack the Ripper murders, the 1910 Houndsditch murders, and the response to the IRA's bombing campaign during the years of the Troubles. The early 1990s saw the IRA carry out a number of high-profile attacks in the city, such as the 1992 Baltic Exchange bombing and the 1993 Bishopsgate bombing, resulting in huge economic and infrastructural damage. As a result, the Traffic and Environmental Zone, better known as the "ring of steel", was officially established in 1993 by Owen Kelly, the then City of London Police commissioner. Some aspects of the ring of steel were 'stepped down' in the late 1990s following the cessation of IRA hostilities but stepped up again after the September 11 terrorist attacks.

In May 2020, City of London Police officers stopped a vehicle driven by a man who had recently been interviewed by Channel 4 about a prior instance of police harassment, who they incorrectly accused of concealing drugs. After smashing his car window, officers strip-searched him, detained him for 21 hours and impounded his car. Following an investigation, City of London Police acknowledged failings in their treatment of the man, including returning the vehicle to him without first removing the broken glass, but declined to apologise and said his arrest had been lawful. In March 2021 the Independent Office for Police Conduct ordered City of London Police to conduct a new investigation into the incident.

List of commissioners

 Daniel Whittle Harvey (1839–1863)
 Colonel Sir James Fraser (1863–1890)
 Lieutenant-Colonel Sir Henry Smith (1890–1902)
 Captain Sir William Nott-Bower (1902–1925)
 Lieutenant-Colonel Sir Hugh Turnbull (1925–1950)
 Colonel Sir Arthur Young (1950–1971)
 James Page (1971–1977)
 Peter Marshall (1977–1985)
 Owen Kelly (1985–1994)
 William Taylor (1994–1998)
 Perry Nove (1998–2002)
 James Hart (2002–2006)
 Mike Bowron (2006–2011)
 Adrian Leppard (2011–2015)
 Ian Dyson (2016–2022)
 Angela McLaren (2022–present)

Officers killed in the line of duty

According to the Police Roll of Honour Trust, 32 City of London Police staff have died in the line of duty, the first in 1857 and the most recent in 2002. Line-of-duty deaths include three officers who were fatally shot in 1910 prior to the Siege of Sidney Street; several killed in Nazi German air raids over London in 1941 and 1942; and the 1993 death of Commander Hugh Moore (who suffered a heart failure following a violent arrest).

Organisation
The City Police is organised into five directorates:
 Economic Crime Directorate
 Crime Directorate
 Uniformed Policing Directorate
 Information and Intelligence Directorate
 Business Support Directorate

Because of the City's role as a world financial centre, the City of London Police has developed a great deal of expertise in dealing with fraud and "is the acknowledged lead force within the UK for economic crime investigation." The Economic Crime Directorate includes:
 Dedicated Card and Payment Crime Unit (DCPCU)
 Insurance Fraud Department (IFED)
 National Fraud Intelligence Bureau (NFIB) and Action Fraud
 Police Intellectual Property Crime Unit (PIPCU)
 Economic Crime Academy (ECA) responsible for delivering counter fraud and economic crime training both nationally and internationally
 The Directorate also formerly had an Overseas Anti-Corruption Unit (OACU), however this unit (along with the Metropolitan Police's Proceeds of Corruption Unit) was transferred to the NCA in 2015 and renamed the International Corruption Unit (ICU).

Leadership structure
 Commissioner – Angela McLaren
 Assistant Commissioner (Operational Policing) – Paul Betts
 Assistant Commissioner (Fraud and Cyber Crime) – Peter O'Doherty
 Commander (Operations and Security) – Umer Khan OBE
 Commander (National Coordinator for Economic and Cyber Crime) – Nik Adams

Uniform

Whereas the majority of British police forces have white metal cap badges and buttons, those of the City Police are brass. The force also have red and white chequered sleeve and cap bands (red and white being the colours of the City of London), which in most other British police forces are black and white. In formal uniform, female officers wear a red and white cravat.

Their helmet (worn by male constables and sergeants) has altered little since its introduction in 1865 and has a crest instead of the white metal boss worn on the Metropolitan Police helmet. The "helmet plate" or badge is the City of London coat of arms; this is unusual for a police force in England and Wales in that it does not include St Edward's Crown, neither does it have the Brunswick Star, which is used on most other police helmets in England and Wales.

On state and ceremonial occasions, the commissioner and assistant commissioners wear a special court dress uniform with a gold aiguillette and a cocked hat adorned with white swan's feathers; other than on these occasions, they wear standard uniform.

Equipment and vehicles

City of London police carry warrant cards. Like other British police forces, City of London police officers are not routinely armed, but some officers have received firearms training and are authorised firearms officers. City of London police equipment includes PAVA irritant spray, batons, and handcuffs. Many officers are also equipped with the Taser electroshock weapon; according to the police force's reported figures, Tasers have been deployed (including drawing or "red-dotting") about seven times per month. In the September 2018 to September 2020 period, the City of London Police recorded 11 incidents of police officers firing Tasers on suspects.

The City of London Police maintains a fleet of police vehicles, including SUVs, compact cars, motorcycle, and vans, as well as one horsebox. All of the force's response vehicles, including armed response vehicles (ARVs) carry a defibrillator and first aid supplies, for use in the event of an emergency.

Mounted unit

The City of London Police maintains a mounted police unit. In addition to regular duties, the horses of the mounted unit have been used to trample wildflower seeds at the Barbican Wildlife Garden at the request of the community wildlife gardeners. The horses' ceremonial duties include participation in Trooping the Colour and the Lord Mayor's Show; the City of London Police mounted unit also escorted the exhumed remains of King Richard III through the city of Leicester from St Nicholas Church to Leicester Cathedral, en route to their reburial.

Ranks

The ranks from constable to chief superintendent are the same as all other British police forces. The three senior ranks are similar to those used by the Metropolitan Police.

Insignia
Constables and sergeants display collar numbers on their rank badges (in the range 1 to 150 for sergeants and 151 to 999 for constables). Officers between the ranks of inspector and chief superintendent (who do not have collar numbers) display their warrant numbers instead. All officers also wear name badges with their rank and surname (e.g. Police Constable John Smith would wear a badge displaying "Constable Smith").

The City of London police also has a special constabulary with seven ranks of officers. As with regular officers, constables and sergeants display collar numbers on their rank badges (in the range 1001 to 1099 for sergeants and 1101 to 1299 for constables) and officers between the ranks of inspector and chief superintendent display their warrant numbers, in all cases followed by the letters "SC". The rank badge for a special commander is identical to that for a regular commander. Name badges are identical to those worn by regular officers (e.g. Special Sergeant Mary Jones would wear a badge displaying "Sergeant Jones").

As well as a PCSO rank

Workforce
The following is the current released workforce data. The "chief officer" category includes the commissioner, assistant commissioner and commanders, and the "special constable" category includes all special constable ranks.

Special Constabulary

History
The City of London Police have had special constables since at least 1911, when 1,648 were called for duty during docks strikes. There was one day in 1918, when the only warranted officer within the city of London was a special constable

Current status

It consists of 62 special constables, the majority of whom are attached to the Uniformed Policing Directorate (led by a special superintendent, who forms part of that directorate's management team, assisted by a special chief inspector and a number of special inspectors and special sergeants), and undertake duties during evenings and nights in support of the regular force in dealing with issues arising from the busy night-time economy of the city. However, other officers perform more specialist roles in the force's other directorates, including fraud investigation in the Economic Crime Directorate and control room operation in the Intelligence and Information Directorate. Many officers have specialist training and perform duties as response drivers, "Level 2" public order officers and cycle officers.

As in all forces, special constables are expected to commit to a minimum of 200 hours' duty each year, and in return receive out-of-pocket expenses and free travel on the Transport for London network. They receive no pay.

Uniform and equipment is identical to that of regular (full-time) police officers. Officers of the Honourable Artillery Company Detachment of Special Constabulary (which forms part of the CLSC) wear the title "HAC" when in formal uniform. Special Constables have four-digit collar numbers beginning 11 or 12, and Special Sergeants have four-digit collar numbers beginning 10.

The CLSC were awarded the Ferrers Trophy in 2006 for the efforts of their officers after the 7 July 2005 London bombings. The award is given annually to police volunteers, for exceptional dedication and innovation. It was the first time in the award's history that an entire special constabulary received the trophy.

Honourable Artillery Company Detachment
In 1919, following a decision to increase the strength of the Metropolitan Police Reserve Force, the Home Secretary approached the Honourable Artillery Company to form a division of special constabulary. Some 150 members, mostly Great War veterans, rallied to the call and joined the division, forming the HAC Detachment. At the outbreak of the Second World War, the detachment was integrated into G Division of the Metropolitan Police and then later with Islington Division. Following reorganisation, the detachment is now part of the City of London Police Special Constabulary, its administrative base is Armoury House.

In 2010, the Ferrers Trophy was awarded to Special Constable Patrick Rarden of the detachment for using his banking skills and experience to help train colleagues and provide invaluable assistance to solve fraud cases.

Olympics

Teams of the City of London Police have participated in the Olympic games three times in the tug of war tournament. At the 1908 Summer Olympics they won the gold medal, beating a team of the Liverpool Police in the final. In 1912 the team was beaten in the final by one of the Stockholm Police. At the 1920 Summer Olympics the team regained its title, beating the Netherlands. This was the last time tug of war was an Olympic sport, which means the City of London Police is still the reigning Olympic champion.

Museum
The City of London Police Museum is dedicated to the police force and its story of policing. Exhibits include uniforms, Victorian-era police equipment and artefacts, communication devices, World War II displays, and exhibits about Jack the Ripper and other famous murder cases.

The museum relocated in November 2016 to the space formerly used by the Clockmakers' Museum, next to the Guildhall Library.
The new museum was funded by a £90,000 Heritage Lottery Fund grant. It was closed to become a COVID testing centre during the COVID-19 pandemic and as of May 2022 had not yet reopened.

Other corporation policing bodies
The Corporation of London, the local authority for the city, also operates further limited policing bodies. These bodies are not part of the City of London Police:
 City of London market constabularies
 Hampstead Heath Constabulary,
 Epping Forest Keepers

See also
 Fraud Squad
 Law enforcement in the United Kingdom
 List of law enforcement agencies in the United Kingdom, Crown Dependencies and British Overseas Territories
 Project Griffin

References

External links 

 
 City of London Police at HMICFRS

 
Police
Police forces of London
Police forces of England